The International 9000 Series is a range of trucks that was manufactured by Navistar International (previously International Harvester).  Introduced as the Transtar 4000 in 1971, the model line was produced across three generations until 2017; following the incorporation of Navistar, the Transtar was rebranded as the 9000 series.  Slotted below the Paystar range (in terms of size), the 9000 series was a conventional-cab truck configured primarily for highway applications.

Produced exclusively in a Class 8 configuration, the Transtar 4000/9000 Series was offered in multiple layouts, including single or tandem rear axles, daycabs or multiple sizes of sleeper cabs.

During the 2000s, International phased out much of the model line in favor of the newer ProStar and LoneStar; after a 46-year production run, the final 9900i was produced in 2017. 


First generation (Transtar; 1971-1985) 

For 1971, International introduced the Transtar 4200/4300 series as its heavy-duty conventional.  Replacing the Transtar 400 (an update of the D-400 introduced in 1961), the 1971 Transtar introduced an all-new cab, replacing the "Emeryville" cab (introduced in 1957).  The Transtar was offered in two model lines, the standard-hood 4270 and the long-hood 4370.

The cab of the first-generation Transtar was adopted for the severe-service Paystar 5000; its doors were shared by the 9000-series COEs.  A steel cab was standard; an aluminum cab was optional.

At its launch, the Transtar 4200/4300 was offered with a range of diesel engines, with the 4200 offered with V8 engines and inline-engines for the longer-hood 4300. A Detroit Diesel 260 hp 8V71 V8 was standard on the 4270, with a 230 hp Cummins NH inline-6 standard on the 4370; the latter model was offered with a 434 hp Detroit Diesel 12V71 V12.  The engines were paired with manual transmissions, ranging from 5 to 16 speeds (along with optional 4-speed auxiliary transmission).  At the end of the 1970s, the 4300 was fitted with the largest diesel engines ever fitted in a road-going vehicle, including the 450 hp Cummins KT inline-6 (1150 cubic inches) and the Caterpillar 3408 V8 (1099 cubic inches).

Second generation (1985-1999) 

Following the corporate transition of International Harvester to Navistar, the Transtar series underwent several minor revisions to the exterior and badging, with the model line becoming the International 9370. The 4270 was dropped, with the 9370 receiving a larger grille and hood (distinguished by vertically-stacked headlamps).

In 1989, Navistar introduced several changes to the model line; in line with other International product lines, the 9370 was renamed the International 9300. For the first time, a set-back front axle configuration was offered.

For 1990 the 9400 was introduced as the first aerodynamic conventional from International, using a set-back front axle and a sloped hood. While less radical than the Ford Aeromax or the Kenworth T600, the 9400 offered skirted fuel tanks as an option. In 1993, the 9200 was introduced (a shorter-hood version of the 9400); the set-back axle version of the 9300 was dropped. In 1992 the luxuriously appointed 9400 Midnight Eagle Limited Edition was introduced; offered only with the Caterpillar 3406 diesel engine it had a leather interior with wood trim and a fully color-coordinated exterior. In 1997, the 9100 was introduced; produced largely as a daycab.

For 1997, International gave the 9000-series (outside of the 9300) a mid-cycle update, with a redesign of the grille, front bumper, and headlight surrounds.

For 1999, the 9300 (derived from the 1971 Transtar 4300) was replaced by the 9900, pairing a squared-off long hood design with headlights faired into the fenders.

Third generation (i-series; 2000-2017) 

Previewed by the 1997 update to the 9000 series and the 9900, for 2000, the International heavy truck range underwent their most extensive redesign since 1971.  While sharing its underlying aluminum structure, the firewall of the cab was moved forward (enlarging the drivers compartment).  In place of the previous two-pane flat glass, a single-piece curved windshield was fitted, along with cowl-mounted wipers.  To improve outward visibility, the cowl was lowered (along with the lower half of the door windows); vent windows were deleted.

The third-generation 9000 series was denoted with an "i" suffix; as with its predecessor, it shared its cab with the Paystar severe-service trucks (renamed the Paystar 5000i).  The model line consisted of the 9100i (112-inch BBC), 9200i (112-inch BBC), 9400i (120-inch BBC), 9900i (120-inch BBC), and 9900ix (130-inch BBC).  Sold primarily for regional use, the 9100i was offered only as a daycab (no sleeper).  In contrast to the rest of the sloped-hood model line, the 9900i and 9900ix were configured with straight hoods, and the 9900ix was offered only with premium Eagle trim.

During the 2000s and early 2010s, International began to pare down the models of the 9000 series in favor of newer designs based on the NGV cab.  After the 2002 model year, the 9100i was dropped (effectively replaced by the 8000 series).  The 9400i and 9200i were discontinued after 2007 and 2011 (directly replaced by the ProStar).  While far different in design, the 9900ix was functionally replaced by the LoneStar as the extended-hood International conventional.

References 

The external link provided is broken

Commercial vehicles
2000s cars
2010s cars
Navistar International trucks
Vehicles introduced in 1971